Oriwa Tahupotiki Haddon (7 November 1898–17 June 1958) was a New Zealand Methodist minister, pharmacist, artist, cartoonist and broadcaster. Of Māori descent, he identified with the Ngati Ruanui iwi. He was born in Waitotara, Wanganui, New Zealand on 7 November 1898.

Haddon's cartoons were published in the New Zealand Artists' Annual in the 1930s. His cartoons of Maori were those of an 'insider', and 'laughed at Maori in a gentler fashion than his contemporaries'.

References

1898 births
1958 deaths
New Zealand artists
New Zealand Methodist ministers
Ngāti Ruanui people
New Zealand Māori religious leaders
New Zealand broadcasters
New Zealand pharmacists